Vernal Equinox is the debut studio album by Jon Hassell, released in 1977 by Lovely Music, Ltd.

Track listing

Personnel
Adapted from the Vernal Equinox liner notes.

 Jon Hassell – trumpet, electric piano (A1, A3), production
Musicians
 Miguel Frasconi – bells and claves (A3)
 Andy Jerison – synthesizer (A3)
 Nicolas Kilbourn – mbira and talking drum (A3)
 David Rosenboom – synthesizer (A1, A3), mbira (A2), rattles (A3), goblet drum (B1), recording
 Naná Vasconcelos – congas (A1, B1, B2), shakers (A1, A3), bells (A2), talking drum (A2)
 William Winant – kanjira and rattles (A3)

Production and additional personnel
 Michael Brook – recording
 Andy Jerison – recording
 Rich LePage – mixing
 Ariel Peeri – design

Release history

References

External links 
 

1977 debut albums
Jon Hassell albums
Lovely Music albums